The 2018 Italian Athletics Championships was the 108th edition of the Italian Athletics Championships and took place in Pescara from 7 to 9 September.

Champions

See also
2018 Italian Athletics Indoor Championships

References

External links
 All results at FIDAL web site

Italian Athletics Championships
Athletics
Italian Athletics Outdoor Championships
Athletics competitions in Italy